Major John Belli was an English-born American military officer who served as the Quartermaster General of the United States Army from 1792 to 1794. The first settler in Scioto County, Ohio, he lived there until his death in 1809.

References

1760 births
1809 deaths
Continental Army officers from England
Military personnel from Liverpool
People from Scioto County, Ohio
Quartermasters General of the United States Army